Silapathar College, established in 1979, is a major and general degree college situated in Silapathar, Assam. This college is affiliated with the Dibrugarh University.

Departments

Arts and Commerce
 Assamese
 English
History
Education
Economics
Philosophy
Political Science
Sociology
Commerce

References

External links
http://www.silapatharcollege.edu.in/

Universities and colleges in Assam
Colleges affiliated to Dibrugarh University
Educational institutions established in 1979
1979 establishments in Assam